Early Days or The Early Days may refer to:

Magazine
 Early Days (journal), the annual journal of the Royal Western Australian Historical Society

Music
 Early Days (The Watersons album), 1994
 Early Days: The Best of Led Zeppelin Volume One, 1999
 Early Days (Beth Hirsch album), 2000
 The Early Days of Bonfire, 2004
 The History of Iron Maiden – Part 1: The Early Days, 2004 DVD
 "Early Days", 2013 song by Paul McCartney 

 Early Days, Zombies U.S. compilation album, 1969

Art
 Early Days, a famous statue in San Francisco, California, USA